LIVE OAK was the code name for a military planning group formed by the United States, United Kingdom, and France during the Cold War to plan for a response to any Soviet or Warsaw Pact aggression against West Berlin.

In November 1958, Soviet Premier Nikita Khrushchev issued an ultimatum to the three other Allied powers to withdraw from Berlin within six months and make it a free and demilitarised city, after that access to Berlin would be controlled by East Germany. In response the United States, United Kingdom, and France stated their determination to remain in the city and maintain their legal right of free access to West Berlin. The Soviet Union withdrew the deadline before it passed in 1959 and engaged in negotiations with the other powers.

The LIVE OAK staff, which was formed by the three countries during the crisis, prepared land and air plans to guarantee access to and from West Berlin. LIVE OAK was part of the contingency planning during the next Berlin Crisis of 1961, culminating in the city's de facto partition with the East German erection of the Berlin Wall. West German planners were invited to join the staff in 1961. The planning group continued to operate during the Cold War until it was no longer necessary with the German reunification and the end of the Western Allied occupation of West Berlin. On 3 October 1990, the day Germany was officially reunified, East and West Berlin formally reunited as the city of Berlin.

References

See also 
 Berlin Crisis of 1961
 West Berlin

History of Berlin